Katie Taylor vs. Amanda Serrano, billed as For History, was a women's lightweight professional boxing match contested between undisputed world champion, Katie Taylor, and seven-division world champion, Amanda Serrano. The bout was held on April 30, 2022, at Madison Square Garden in New York City, with Taylor's undisputed lightweight titles on the line. It was the first women's boxing match to headline Madison Square Garden, and was described as the 'biggest women's fight of all time'.
Taylor defeated Serrano by split decision.

The fight was universally acclaimed, being named Fight of the Year by Sports Illustrated, as well as Event of the Year by The Ring.

Background
The two were originally scheduled to fight on May 2, 2020 at the Manchester Arena. However, due to the COVID-19 pandemic, the bout was postponed and rescheduled to 4 July, with the venue changing to the Matchroom Sport headquarters in Brentwood, Essex. After being postponed for a second time, Taylor’s promoter Eddie Hearn revealed he was in talks to secure a rematch between Taylor and Delfine Persoon. On July 9, it was confirmed that the Taylor vs. Persoon rematch would take place on August 22 on the undercard of Dillian Whyte vs. Alexander Povetkin. Taylor won the fight by unanimous decision.

The bout was officially announced on January 27, 2022, and was co-promoted by Hearn's Matchroom Boxing and Jake Paul's Most Valuable Promotions, who are the respective promoters of Taylor and Serrano. The fight was broadcast on DAZN.

Taylor already held a victory over Amanda's sister Cindy, having defeated her by unanimous decision in October 2018.

During a press conference for the fight, Serrano, citing the historical nature of the contest, suggested that the fight be 12 three-minute rounds, as is the case in men's world championship boxing, rather than the women's standard of 10 two-minute rounds. Taylor dismissed this idea, saying ”I don't think it will make a huge difference to the event; it's already iconic as it is.”

Fight card

References

External links 

Boxing matches
2022 in women's boxing
2022 in American sports
2022 in sports in New York City
April 2022 sports events in the United States
Boxing matches at Madison Square Garden